The ASW 27 is a 15 metre Class glider built of modern fibre reinforced composites, which first flew in 1995 and was certified in 1997. The manufacturer of the ASW 27 is Alexander Schleicher GmbH & Co. The "W" indicates this is a design of the influential and prolific German designer Gerhard Waibel.

Design and development
The ASW 27 has plain flaps, winglets, a retractable undercarriage and a water ballast system. The ASW 27 superseded the ASW 20 in the manufacturer's production line.

The structure is a complex composite of carbon, aramid and polyethylene fibre reinforced plastic. This permits a light structure with the strength to carry large amounts of water ballast, thus permitting the widest possible range of wing loadings for weak and strong soaring weather. The strong fuselage was tested for crash protection by dropping one from a crane.

The winglets were standard equipment from the beginning, but were later enlarged in the ASW-27B development. The "B" also has tanks to hold water ballast rather than bags.  The ASW 27 does not have a version with wing extensions for 18 metres.  This was a design decision to pursue an uncompromised 15 metre racer, as "future engine retrofits or later wingspan increases were specifically ruled out".

The introduction of the ASG 29 gave the ASW 27 a stablemate that can compete in the same class, although the 29 is intended to fly primarily with an 18-metre span and can be motorised. Because of the overlap with the ASG 29, production of the ASW27 has now ceased.

Specifications

See also

References

Alexander Schleicher GmbH & Co
Sailplane Directory
Simons M, Segelflugzeuge 1965–2000, Equip, 2004

Schleicher aircraft
1990s German sailplanes
Aircraft first flown in 1995
T-tail aircraft
Shoulder-wing aircraft